Ruda  is a village in the administrative district of Gmina Gidle, within Radomsko County, Łódź Voivodeship, in central Poland.

In 2006 the village had an approximate population of 200.

References

External links
 Gmina Gidle website
 Pictures of Ruda and its neighbourhood

Ruda